Baihe Gujin Wan (pinyin: bǎihégù jīnwán ) is a blackish-brown honeyed pill used in Traditional Chinese medicine to "nourish yin of the lung, resolve phlegm and relieve cough". It is used when there is "deficiency of yin of the lung and the kidney marked by dry cough, scanty expectoration, bloody sputum, dryness and pain in the throat". Honey is added as a binding agent to make the pill.

Chinese classic herbal formula

See also
 Chinese classic herbal formula
 Bu Zhong Yi Qi Wan

References

Traditional Chinese medicine pills